Fratricide (from the Latin words  "brother" and the assimilated root of  "to kill, to cut down") is the act of killing one's own brother.

It can either be done directly or via the use of either a hired or an indoctrinated intermediary (an assassin). The victim need not be the perpetrator's biological brother. In a military context, fratricide refers to a service member killing a comrade.

Religion and mythology 
The Abrahamic religions recognize the biblical account of Cain and Abel as the first fratricidal murder to be committed. In the mythology of ancient Rome, the city is founded as the result of a fratricide, with the twins Romulus and Remus quarreling over who has the favour of the gods and over each other's plans to build Rome, with Romulus becoming Rome's first king and namesake after killing his brother.

Osiris Myth 

In ancient Egyptian mythology, the god Osiris is murdered by his brother Set who usurps the throne.

The Mahabharata and the Ramayana
In the Hindu epic Mahābhārata, Karna was killed by Arjuna who was unaware that Karna was his eldest brother. Though not exactly fratricide, the otherwise meticulously pious Arjuna's actions.
However, the context of the crime becomes markedly different when seen from the following angle:

1. Arjuna was oath-bound to avenge the death of his only son and heir apparent Abhimanyu who had been mercilessly slaughtered by a group of bloodthirsty warriors which included Karna.

2. While Arjuna was unaware that Karna was his own biological brother, the latter was apprised of the same by their common mother Kunti. And hence, even though he was privy to the bond of brotherhood, Karna still wholeheartedly (due to his allegiance to prince Duryodana) and readily elected to indulge in fratricide.

The 13th century poet, Kavi Kabila, while commenting broadly on the Ramayana and on Rama's killing of Raavan with the active support of the latter's estranged younger brother Vibhisan – upon whom Raavan had vowed black vengeance and on the killing of Bali (again by Rama) with the ready contrivance of his younger, disgruntled and banished, sibling Sugreev, has succinctly expressed this in a couplet:
"Irony? What Irony?! If not that the seed of destruction carried in the heart of one brother was sowed and reaped to the full by the hand of another!"

Roman Empire

The only known fratricide in the Roman Empire is the reasonably well-known murder of Geta on the orders of his brother Caracalla in 211. The brothers had a fraught relationship enduring many years; upon their father Septimius Severus's death in February 211, they succeeded him as co-emperors. Their joint rule was embittered and unsuccessful, with each of them conspiring to have the other one murdered. In December of that year, Caracalla pretended to be holding a reconciliation in their mother Julia Domna's apartment when Geta was lured to come unarmed and unguarded. A group of Centurions loyal to Caracalla ambushed him upon Geta's arrival, with Geta dying in his mother's arms. It is said that the fratricide would often come back to haunt Caracalla.

In Roman Mythology, Romulus, or one of his followers, kills his twin brother Remus and goes on to found Rome. How and why the death occurred is debated and is not known for sure.

Persian Empire

There are many recorded fratricides in Persia, the most famous of which involving Cyrus the Great's sons Cambyses II and Bardiya, the former killing the latter. There are also stories about the sons of Artaxerxes I, Xerxes II, Sogdianus, and Darius II, all of which concern competition for the throne. In addition, there were many fratricides recorded during the Parthian and Sassanid Empires.

Tang Empire 

Prince Li Shimin (Prince of Qin), the second son of Emperor Gaozu, was in an intense rivalry with his elder brother Crown Prince Li Jiancheng and younger brother Prince Li Yuanji (Prince of Qi). He took control and set up an ambush at Xuanwu Gate, the northern gate leading to the Palace City of the imperial capital Chang'an. There, Li Jiancheng and Li Yuanji were murdered by Li Shimin and his men. Within three days after the coup, Li Shimin was installed as the crown prince. Emperor Gaozu abdicated another sixty days later and passed the throne to Li Shimin, who would become known as Emperor Taizong.

Ottoman Empire

Fratricide was not a legal practice in the foundation of the Ottoman Empire. The practice of fratricide was legalized by Mehmed II. His grandfather, Mehmed I, struggled over the throne with his brothers Süleyman, İsa, and Musa during the Ottoman Interregnum. This civil war lasted eight years and weakened the empire due to the casualties it inflicted and the division it sowed in Ottoman society. As a result, Mehmed II formally legalized the practice of fratricide in order to preserve the state and not further place strain on the unity as previous civil wars did. Mehmed II stated, "Of any of my sons that ascends the throne, it is acceptable for him to kill his brothers for the common benefit of the people (nizam-i alem). The majority of the ulama (Muslim scholars) have approved this; let action be taken accordingly."

When Mehmed's son, Bayezid II died, his son Selim I immediately assumed the throne and proceeded to execute his two brothers Ahmed and Korkut. The largest practice of fratricide was committed by Mehmed III when he had 19 of his brothers and half-brothers murdered and buried alongside their father. His successor Ahmed I when faced with public disapproval for the practice of fratricide decided to outlaw the practice and replace it with seniority ascension system along with imprisonment in the Kafes of any prince who would be a possible threat to the throne.

Mughal Empire 
In the Mughal Empire, fratricides often occurred as a result of wars of succession. Shah Jahan had his eldest brother Khusrau Mirza killed in 1622. Shah Jahan also had his brother Shahriyar killed in 1628. Shah Jahan's son, Dara Shikoh was assassinated by four of his brother Aurangzeb's henchmen in front of his terrified son on the night of 30 August 1659 (9 September Gregorian).

Antigone

The events in the Greek tragedy Antigone unfold due to the previous war between the princely brothers, Eteocles and Polyneices, who killed each other in combat. Polyneices had challenged his brother's claim to the throne of the city Thebes, and attacked the city with an army from Argos. Eteocles fought for Thebes to defend the city against Polyneices and his army. The two killed each other by stabbing in the heart.

Ashoka's Empire

Ashoka, also known as Chand-Ashoka (Cruel Ashoka), killed his brothers as punishment for the king's (his father) death and quarrel for the kingdom (war of succession). Later on, Ashoka conquered Greater India entire, before he adopted Buddhism and forsook war.

Zulu Kingdom

Shaka, the Zulu king, was killed by his half-brother Dingane and his brother Mhlangana in 1828. Dingane became the Zulu leader until he was assassinated in 1840 in the Hlatikhulu Forest.

In fiction

Plays 
 In Shakespeare's Hamlet, Claudius kills the elder Hamlet and marries his wife to take the throne.

Films
 In the animated Disney film The Lion King, Scar commits fratricide on Mufasa by casting him off a cliff into a wildebeest stampede below.
 In the religious horror film Mother!, the older brother commits fratricide on the younger brother, as a retelling of the story of Cain and Abel.
 In the American crime film The Godfather Part II, Michael Corleone kills Fredo, his older brother.
 In the Marvel Cinematic Universe superhero film Black Panther, T'Chaka kills his younger brother, N'Jobu, in defense of Zuri, a Wakandan warrior.
 In the superhero film Shazam!, Dr. Sivana murders his abusive older brother, Sid, by throwing him out a window as revenge for all the years he bullied him.

Books
 Shahnameh, the national epic of Greater Persia, includes many fratricides. The most famous such story is that of the sons of Fereydun, in which Salm and Tur commit fratricide on the younger brother, Iraj.
 There are also other stories in Shahnameh involving fratricide; Rustam, the national hero of Greater Persia, and Aghrirat, Prince of Turan, are both killed by their brothers.
 In A Song of Ice and Fire, Daenerys Targaryen saw her elder brother Viserys killed by her husband, Khal Drogo, pouring molten gold over his head.
 Stannis Baratheon kills his younger brother Renly Baratheon with a shadow assassin, though Renly intended to usurp the throne and kill Stannis.
 Euron Greyjoy admits to his brother Aeron Greyjoy that he slew their oldest full brother Balon Greyjoy, though not personally, and that he killed two of their half-brothers, Harlon Greyjoy and Robyn Greyjoy.
 Historically, during "The Blackfyre Rebellion", Brynden Rivers slew his half-brother, the King-claimant Daemon I Blackfyre, when he rose against their mutual half-brother Daeron II Targaryen.
 In The Hedge Knight Prince Maekar Targaryen accidentally kills his eldest brother Prince Baelor Targaryen in a trial by combat.
 Also, at the Dance of the Dragons, an inter-Targaryen civil war, Rhaenyra Targaryen was killed by her half-brother, Aegon II by incinerating her in dragon's flame.
 In Dante's Divine Comedy, Caina is the first of the four divisions of a Circle and takes its name from the first fratricide, the murderer Cain.
 In Canto 32 of Divine Comedy, Alessandro and Napoleone, sons of Alberto degli Alberti, lord of Falterona in the valley of the Bisenzio are examples of fratricide.

See also

 A Fratricide by Franz Kafka
 Cain and Abel
 Romulus and Remus
 List of fratricides
 Friendly fire, fratricide in the martial sense

References

Killings by type
Familicides
Homicide
Death of men
 
Violence against men
Sibling rivalry